Dokha ("dizziness" or "vertigo") is a tobacco product, consisting of dried and finely shredded tobacco flakes mixed with herbs and spices. It originated in Iran during the 15th century. Unlike hookah tobacco (also called "shisha" or "mu'assel"), dokha is not cured with molasses. Users smoke the tobacco blend in small quantities using a pipe called a midwakh. Because the midwakh pipe is used almost exclusively for smoking dokha, the terms are often used interchangeably.

Dokha has a higher concentration of nicotine compared to other forms of tobacco, and can cause brief periods of euphoria, relaxation or lightheadedness in some users. As using the midwakh also reportedly leaves fewer lingering smells, and requires less tobacco to be used at a time, it can be used discreetly, which has made it popular among student populations and young adults.

The product is popular in the United Arab Emirates (UAE), Oman, Qatar, Saudi Arabia, Yemen, Bahrain, Jordan, and other Middle Eastern countries. It has reportedly spread to Europe, Bhatkal in India and other regions via immigration, tourism and trade. Scientific research on the health effects of dokha use is lacking, but officials have concerns over the use of the product as a touted cigarette alternative, and preliminary studies have quantified dokha's high nicotine and tar concentration, as well as toxins present in its smoke. Notable concern in the UAE over the spreading popularity of dokha among teenagers and young adults has led to multiple tobacco control efforts to curb its use.

History 

Dokha tobacco and its derivatives have been cultivated and used in Middle Eastern countries for approximately 500 years. It originated in Iran during the 15th century, as use spread among sailors in the Caspian Sea, which led to its eventual spread throughout all of the Middle East during the following centuries. Traditionally, dokha consists of dried and ground tobacco leaves, blended with herbs, spices, dried flowers and fruits. Depending on local traditions, bark and leaves of native plants were also used.

Preparation 
Modern dokha maintains many of the characteristics of its traditional forms, consisting of tobacco and spices without any preservatives, pesticides, herbicides or additives that are commonly used in mass-produced tobacco products. Due to the lesser degree of processing, Dokha tobacco appears essentially unaltered, retaining the natural green color of the plant.

Unlike most tobaccos, dokha is not fire cured and cut, but dried in the arid desert region where it is harvested. It is finely ground to preserve the strength, freshness and flavor of the tobacco.  The tobacco is then blended with other spices and herbs to create the final product. In many countries where dokha is used, there are a number of available tobacco strengths (typically described in Arabic as "hot", "warm" or "cold"), which indicate the harshness of a particular blend.

Usage

Smoking 
Dokha is almost exclusively smoked out of an elongated pipe called a midwakh (alternatively spelled 'medwakh'). The traditional midwakh has no filter, but more recent variations contain a removable, stem-mounted filter. A small container called a chanta is sometimes used to store and dispense the tobacco. Approximately 0.5-1 grams of dokha tobacco is smoked at a time, and is usually consumed in about two inhalations. One study estimates that the typical daily user of dokha consumes approximately 6 grams, or 12 smoking sessions.

A preliminary study found dokha has significantly more nicotine than other tobacco products such as shisha tobacco or cigarettes. Nicotine produces various pharmacologic and psycho-dynamic effects in the brain within seconds, which generally last for 30 seconds to several minutes, depending on the user's nicotine tolerance. These include euphoria, increased alertness and a sense of relaxation and dokha is known for a strong production of these effects, which allows it to quickly satisfy nicotine cravings.

Users sometimes describe the sensation as 'dizziness', which is where dokha's name (meaning 'dizziness' or 'vertigo' in Arabic) is presumed to be derived. Dokha does not traditionally contain other psychoactive substances, such as cannabis or hashish, but in some cultures where dokha is uncommon, it has been reportedly mistaken for marijuana.

Prevalence 
While dokha is not a relatively new alternative tobacco product, its use had a notable increase in the Middle East, particularly in the UAE, and especially among males aged 20–39, during the 2000s and 2010s. Experts speculate this may be due to tobacco control efforts' exclusive focus on cigarette use, coupled with the fact that dokha and midwakh usage in these countries has become the second-most popular form of tobacco, after cigarettes.

Culminating in legislative efforts in 2009 and 2018, there has also been particular concern in the UAE that teenagers may be getting easier access to dokha tobacco when they are unable to obtain cigarettes, and that dokha has quickly become popular among young adults. Dokha's reported lack of lingering smells (compared to other forms of smoked tobacco) and the relatively smaller amount of material smoked in a given session, make it a convenient form of discreetly and quickly satisfying nicotine cravings, which has made dokha popular among underage smokers. One study assessing the prevalence of dokha smoking among secondary school students in the UAE found that 39% had ever smoked tobacco products, 36% had ever smoked dokha specifically, and 25% of them were now current users of dokha, which is very high compared to other forms of smoking.

Dokha use has seen some emergence in the Western world, and some health officials speculate this may be due to immigration, globalized commerce, and internet sales, but such a trend has not been definitively studied or proven. Retail companies specifically catering to dokha smokers can now be found in the United Kingdom, and more tobacco shops are stocking dokha and midwakh accessories to fill a gap in the market, which some company representatives claim is driven by increased immigration from Middle Eastern countries. There have been reports that Dokha may be spreading in popularity in some regions of India, due to one successful startup offering the product.

Sale and regulation 

Dokha is regulated by most countries in the same manner as they would other tobacco products.

United Arab Emirates 
The UAE passed "Federal Law No. 15 regarding Tobacco Control" in December 2009, making the legal age to purchase tobacco (including dokha) 18 years old. The law also made smoking in cars (with children under 12 present), houses of worship, educational campuses and health/fitness centers, illegal. This law was expanded in 2012 by adopting GSO standards that require tobacco packaging warning messages.

In October 2015, the Dubai Municipality issued warnings to 40 dokha shops to obtain certificates of conformity from the UAE Authority for Standardization and Metrology. The shops were required to discontinue the practices of allowing customers to sample dokha in the shop and cleaning their midwakh pipes for them in order to obtain these certificates. Despite these efforts, there were still concerns from local leaders and health officials over shopkeepers illegally selling dokha and midwakh pipes to underage customers, and teenage use of tobacco continued to rise.

An excise tax was introduced on October 1, 2017 on tobacco products in an effort to discourage their consumption. There was confusion among dokha users and retailers as to whether all dokha products, or only specific dokha brands, were subject to the excise tax. A poll the following year showed that one in four smokers said that the new tax changed their habit.

In May 2018, new regulations were approved by the UAE's National Tobacco Control Programme by the Ministry of Health and Prevention. Intended to be in place by the end of the year, the regulations set purchase restrictions specifically on dokha products. They also ban the practice of bottling and refilling larger quantities at home or in shops, which has been the local custom, and require dokha product packaging to include pictorial warnings (the same way other types of tobacco products were required to have per the 2012 law).

Health effects 
Personal accounts from users and marketing materials from dokha retailers claim that the relatively smaller amount of material smoked in a midwakh, and/or the lack of some additives in dokha, make it a less risky form of tobacco. Health professionals consider this a myth, that dokha is likely just as or more dangerous than other forms of smoking, and that more research is needed to investigate the adverse effects, as there is little comparative study between dokha and other tobacco products.

Acute effects 
, few studies have been performed on the acute effects specific to dokha use, but one uncontrolled study among male UAE medical university students assessed the following:

 Increased systolic blood pressure
 Decreased diastolic blood pressure
 Increased heart rate and respiration

Chronic effects 
As dokha consists of tobacco and other plant material, health officials suspect the effects from prolonged use are similar or identical to that of other tobacco products, but  there have been no clinical studies to identify the long-term risks specific to it. Anecdotal evidence from chronic users suggests that long-term use may cause them to feel out of breath after strenuous activity, and they report difficulty quitting.

One study speculated that oral lesions are a possible chronic side effect of irritation from the midwakh pipe.

Some of the health risks of chronic tobacco smoking in general, that have been identified, are:

 Chronic chest infections
Obstructive pulmonary disease
 Increased risk of larynx, respiratory or other organ cancers
Nicotine dependence and tolerance, increased risks of nicotine poisoning

Chemical composition 
A February 2018 study called for further research into the harmful effects of dokha smoke after it found that three different types of dokha tested from the Middle East and North Africa region contained toxic metals comprising "22 irritants, 3 known carcinogens, 5 central nervous system depressants, in addition to several other compounds with miscellaneous effects".

In September 2018, a University of Sharjah study compared the nicotine and tar levels in dokha to other tobacco products, which found dokha had significantly higher levels of both. Nicotine in dokha was measured at 23.83–52.8 mg/g compared to 0.8–20.52 mg/g in shisha, and 0.5–19.5 mg/g in cigarettes. Tar in dokha was measured at 21.6–45.02 mg/g compared to 1.68–11.87 mg/g in shisha and 5–27 mg/g in cigarettes.

In May 2019, a second study at the University of Sharjah attempted to quantify trace metals in dokha and shisha products, using EDXRF. Traces of aluminum, calcium, chromium, copper, iron, magnesium, manganese, nickel, potassium, strontium and zinc were detected in both product types. Across the 13 dokha products tested, the highest mean concentrations were of calcium, potassium and magnesium (8235.77 ± 144.51, 4467.50 ± 168.06, and 2096.20 ± 130.69 μg/g, respectively).

References

External links 
 Vertigo (2016) – "a short documentary film on dokha smoking addiction" (YouTube)

Tobacco products
Pipe smoking
Smoking
Tobacco in the United Arab Emirates